James McGregor (1887 – 20 April 1950) was a South African boxer who competed in the 1920 Summer Olympics. McGregor was born in Ladybrand.  In 1920, he was eliminated in the first round of the light heavyweight class after losing his fight to Edwin Schell of the United States.

McGregor died, aged 62, in Benoni, Gauteng.

References

1887 births
1950 deaths
Light-heavyweight boxers
Olympic boxers of South Africa
Boxers at the 1920 Summer Olympics
People from Ladybrand
Orange Free State people
South African male boxers